Mirrorsoft was a British video game publisher founded by Jim Mackonochie as a division of Mirror Group Newspapers. The company was active between 1983 and 1991, and shut down completely in early 1992.

History 
In the early 1980s, Jim Mackonochie worked as development manager for British communications company Mirror Group Newspapers. On a trip to the U.S., Mackonochie got a hold of a Commodore PET personal computer, alongside a copy of VisiCalc, a spreadsheet application for the system. This combination led him to believe that Mirror, as a communications company, should be working more closely with computer software, wherefore he approached Mirror's board of directors in 1983, suggesting that they launch a software label under Mirror Group's name, and thereby diversifying the group's non-newspaper operations, which already included Mirror Boats and Mirror Books. The division, named Mirrorsoft, was officially launched in late 1983, and Mackonochie was allowed to task several of his staff from his department at Mirror Group to aid him with establishing the division.

On 12 July 1984, Mirror Group was acquired by Robert Maxwell-owned Maxwell Communications. Initially, Mirrorsoft was unaffected by the ownership change, until Mackonochie received a call from Maxwell's son, Kevin, on Boxing Day 1984, in which he was told that he would be permanently moved from development manager of Mirror Group to full-time managing director of Mirrorsoft.

On 5 November 1991, Robert Maxwell died after having previously disappeared from his yacht. Unaware of his fate, Mirrorsoft continued operations as usual, including the publishing of First Samurai, Mega-Lo-Mania and Teenage Mutant Hero Turtles: The Coin-Op through Image Works and good projections for Christmas sales. However, subsequent to Maxwell's death, Maxwell Communications declared bankruptcy in 1992.  Arthur Andersen was appointed administrator for Maxwell's companies, including Mirrorsoft, near the end of November. With the arrival of the administrators, they took over all day-to-day operations at the company, and shut down all Mirrorsoft sales, the division's only source of revenue. Several visits from potential buyers, including Infogrames and MicroProse, were arranged hastily, and a management buyout was considered, but the easiest option was found to be closing the company down and selling off its assets. The majority of Mirrorsoft's staff was laid off on New Year's Eve 1991, with a remaining few being kept for further 1–2 months to help with winding down the company. Several business assets were subsequently sold to Acclaim Entertainment.

List of games 

 Ashkeron!**, 1985
 Boulder Dash, 1985 (UK Distribution, Atari 8-Bit and Amstrad CPC versions)
 Word Games with Mr. Men , 1984 (Widgit Software).
 First Steps with the Mr. Men, 1985
 Dynamite Dan, 1985
 Dynamite Dan II, 1986
 Sai Combat, 1986
 Biggles, 1986
 Spitfire '40, 1986
 Bismarck, 1987
 Legend of the Sword, 1987
 Pegasus Bridge, 1987
 Sorcerer Lord, 1987
 Tobruk, 1987
 Tetris, 1988
 Firezone, 1988
 Austerlitz, 1989
 CONFLICT: EUROPE, 1989
 Falcon, 1989
 Final Frontier, 1989
 Waterloo, 1989
 Battle Master, 1990
 The Final Battle, 1990
 Champion of the Raj, 1991
 J. R. R. Tolkien's Riders of Rohan, 1991
 Speedball 2: Brutal Deluxe'', 1993

See also 
 Personal Software Services
 Image Works
 Throwback Entertainment

References 

Defunct companies of the United Kingdom
Golden Joystick Award winners
Video game companies disestablished in 1991
Video game companies established in 1983
Defunct video game companies of the United Kingdom